Zoe Zeniodi (Greek: Ζωή Ζενιώδη, born 13 February 1976) is a conductor from Greece. She is the first woman conductor to ever perform with Opera Southwest. She has been selected by the Dallas Opera for the residency of the Institute of Women Conductors, 2016. She is the artistic and music director of the Broward Symphony Orchestra (Florida, USA) and the "Momentum" Athens Chamber Orchestra (Athens, Greece), the associate music director and conductor of the Festival of the Aegean (Syros, Greece) and the artistic advisor of the Alhambra Orchestra (Florida, USA).

Musical studies
Zeniodi holds a Doctor of Musical Arts in orchestral conducting from the University of Miami and also studied at the Royal College of Music and the Mozarteum, Salzburg. In an interview to Classical 95.5 FM Radio in March 2017, Zeniodi expressed her close affiliation with American contemporary composer Thomas Sleeper, under whom Zeniodi undertook her early conducting studies and later championed his work.

Career
Zeniodi has conducted opera and ballet productions at the Florida Grand Opera, the Greek National Opera, the Onassis Cultural Center, the Festival of the Aegean and the University of Miami. As a guest conductor, she has worked with the Brno Philharmonic, the Tatarstan National Symphony Orchestra, the New Philharmonic Orchestra of Florida, the Pan-European Philharmonia, the Palm Beach Symphony, the National Radio Symphony Orchestra of Greece, the Kamerata/Armonia Atenea, the Thessaloniki State Symphony Orchestra, the City of Thessaloniki Symphony Orchestra, the Florida Youth Orchestra, the Greater Miami Youth Symphony, the Spanish National Youth Orchestra (JONDE), the ARTéfacts Ensemble and the 21st Ensemble. Zeniodi made her Australian debut in 2022, conducting the Queensland Symphony Orchestra for Poulenc's La voix humaine with Alexandra Flood, and the world premiere of The Call (based on the story "A Phone Call" by Auburn Sandstrom on The Moth) with Ali McGregor.

Recordings
Zeniodi has released three commercial recordings on the Albany Records to critical acclaim: Thomas Sleeper's Translucence (Brno Philharmonic) and XENIA (Frost Symphony Orchestra), as well as Frank Ticheli's An American Dream (Frost Symphony Orchestra). She also released ThivaKm102 with the ARTéfacts Ensemble (Puzzlemusik) and Thomas Sleeper's Through a Glass darkly with the 21st Ensemble (Uroboros Music).

Reviews

"Zeniodi coolly rose to the occasion, drawing stupendous playing from the students of the university's Frost Symphony Orchestra ... Zeniodi drew maximum tension from the opening sequences, bringing the quiet dreamlike section to a great climax. In Shostakovich's Ballet Suite No. 1, Zeniodi drew some of the best playing the orchestra has ever produced. Ensemble playing was knife-edge precise." – South Florida Classical Review, David Fleshler, 22 November 2009

References

External links
 
 
 
 
 ,  competition, Paris

Greek conductors (music)
Greek classical pianists
Greek women pianists
Greek emigrants to the United States
University of Miami Frost School of Music alumni
Alumni of the Royal College of Music
Mozarteum University Salzburg alumni
Accompanists
Musicians from Athens
1976 births
Living people
21st-century conductors (music)
21st-century pianists
21st-century women pianists